Linkville is a neighborhood of Kansas City, Missouri, United States.

Linkville was laid out in 1871, and named after Levi Link, a local merchant.  A post office called Linkville was established in 1878, and remained in operation until 1907.

References

Neighborhoods in Kansas City, Missouri